The .22 Remington Jet (also known as .22 Jet, .22 Center Fire Magnum, or .22 CFM) is a .22 in (5.6mm) American centerfire revolver and rifle cartridge.

Developed jointly by Remington and Smith & Wesson, it was to be used in the Model 53 revolver, which first appeared late in 1961. While it traced its origins to potent wildcats such as the .224 Harvey Kay-Chuk, which ultimately derive from the .22 Hornet, it was a bottlenecked cartridge based upon the .357 Magnum case necked down to a .22 caliber bullet, with an unusually long tapered shoulder.

By 1972, the Model 53 remained the only revolver chambered for it, while Marlin in 1972 was planning a lever rifle in .22 Jet.

The .22 Jet was also a factory chambering for the T/C Contender and the design allowed for it to reach its full potential. No cylinder gap, no case setback.

The .22 Jet was designed as a flat-shooting hunting round for handguns, and it is suitable for handgun hunting of varmints and medium game out to 100 yd (90 m). The 2460 ft/s (750 m/s) and 535 ft-lbf (725 J) claimed for factory test loads did not prove out in service weapons.

See also
List of cartridges by caliber
5mm caliber

References

Sources
Barnes, Frank C., ed. by John T. Amber. ".22 Remington Jet", in Cartridges of the World, pp. 148, & 177. Northfield, IL: DBI Books, 1972. .
__ & _. ".224 Harvey Kay-Chuk", in Cartridges of the World, pp. 131. Northfield, IL: DBI Books, 1972. .

Pistol and rifle cartridges
Weapons and ammunition introduced in 1961
Remington Arms cartridges